Rhinocladiella is a genus of fungi in the family Herpotrichiellaceae. It has 17 species. The genus was circumscribed by Swedish botanist John Axel Nannfeldt in 1934 with R. atrovirens as the type species.

Species
Rhinocladiella amoena 
Rhinocladiella aquaspersa 
Rhinocladiella atrovirens 
Rhinocladiella basitona 
Rhinocladiella compacta 
Rhinocladiella coryli 
Rhinocladiella cristaspora 
Rhinocladiella fasciculata 
Rhinocladiella indica 
Rhinocladiella mackenziei 
Rhinocladiella phaeophora  – Colombia
Rhinocladiella pyriformis 
Rhinocladiella quercus 
Rhinocladiella selenoides 
Rhinocladiella similis 
Rhinocladiella tibetensis  – China
Rhinocladiella vesiculosa

References

Eurotiomycetes
Eurotiomycetes genera
Taxa described in 1934
Taxa named by John Axel Nannfeldt